Njeguški pršut is a specialty of Njeguši in Montenegro. Pršut is dry-cured ham, served uncooked, similar to Italian prosciutto crudo. Its particular flavour and aroma are, according to its producers, the result of the mixture of sea and mountain air and beech wood burned during the drying process.

The curing process includes salting with sea salt for about three weeks, pressing to remove excess liquid for about three weeks, light smoking and drying in the cool mountain breeze for three months followed by maturing process. The whole cycle takes about a year.

See also

Pršut
Cuisine of Montenegro
 List of hams
 List of dried foods

References 

Montenegrin cuisine
Ham
Dried meat